Lower Peover is a village in the civil parish of Nether Peover in the unitary authority of Cheshire West and Chester and the ceremonial county of  Cheshire, England, approximately 6 miles east of Northwich and 4 miles south of Knutsford. The boundary of the civil parish deviates slightly to include Lower Peover in Nether Peover and not the adjacent civil parish of Peover Inferior. The population of the civil parish at the 2011 census was 415.

Lower Peover was also where George S. Patton held meetings with the senior members of the British war cabinet where they discussed plans about many military operations, most notably D-day.

See also

Listed buildings in Nether Peover
St Oswald's Church, Lower Peover

Notes and references

Notes

References

 

Villages in Cheshire
Civil parishes in Cheshire